Sąpólna is a river of Poland, a tributary of the Ukleja south of Płoty.

Rivers of Poland
Rivers of West Pomeranian Voivodeship